Olcella is a genus of frit flies in the family Chloropidae. There are about 11 described species in Olcella.

Species
 Olcella cinerea (Loew, 1863)
 Olcella difficilis (Becker, 1912)
 Olcella finalis (Becker, 1912)
 Olcella parva (Adams, 1904) (chloropid fly)
 Olcella projecta (Malloch, 1913)
 Olcella provocans (Becker, 1912)
 Olcella punctifrons (Becker, 1912)
 Olcella pygmaea (Becker, 1912)
 Olcella quadrivittata (Sabrosky, 1935)
 Olcella submarginalis (Sabrosky, 1935)
 Olcella trigramma (Loew, 1863)

References

Further reading

External links

 Diptera.info

Oscinellinae